Diego Boscaini Zílio (born 23 July 1989) is a Brazilian footballer who plays as a midfielder. He also holds Italian citizenship.

Club career
Zílio made his professional debut in the Segunda Liga for Santa Clara on 9 August 2014 in a game against Oriental.

References

External links
Diego Zílio at ZeroZero

Living people
1989 births
Sportspeople from Rio Grande do Sul
Brazilian people of Italian descent
Brazilian footballers
Association football midfielders
A.C. Alcanenense players
C.D. Santa Clara players
Liga Portugal 2 players
U.D. Leiria players
GS Loures players
S.C.U. Torreense players
G.D. Peniche players
Brazilian expatriate footballers
Brazilian expatriate sportspeople in Portugal
Expatriate footballers in Portugal
Brazilian expatriate sportspeople in Germany
Expatriate footballers in Germany